Alastair Arthur Windsor, 2nd Duke of Connaught and Strathearn (9 August 1914 – 26 April 1943) was a member of the British Royal Family. He was the only child of Prince Arthur of Connaught and Princess Alexandra, 2nd Duchess of Fife. He was a great-grandson of Queen Victoria through his father and the first great-grandchild of Edward VII through his mother. He was also a descendant of Victoria's paternal uncle and predecessor, William IV, through an illegitimate line.

In 1942, he became the second Duke of Connaught and Strathearn and Earl of Sussex when he inherited his grandfather's title. In 1943, at the age of 28, he died of exposure in Canada.

Early life
 
Alastair was born on 9 August 1914 at his parents' home at 54 Mount Street, Mayfair, London (now the Brazilian Embassy). His father was Prince Arthur of Connaught, the only son of Prince Arthur, Duke of Connaught and Strathearn, and Princess Louise Margaret of Prussia. His mother was Princess Alexandra, 2nd Duchess of Fife, the eldest daughter of Alexander Duff, 1st Duke of Fife, and Louise, Princess Royal. Alastair was thus a great-grandchild of Queen Victoria through his father and great-great grandchild of her through his mother.

Alastair was baptised on 1 September 1914 at his parents' home and his godparents were King George V (his maternal great-uncle and his father's paternal cousin), King Alfonso XIII of Spain (for whom Lord Farquhar, a Lord in Waiting to King George, stood proxy), Queen Alexandra (his maternal great-grandmother), the Duke of Connaught and Strathearn (his paternal grandfather, for whom the Duke's equerry Major Malcolm Murray stood proxy), Princess Louise, Duchess of Argyll (his great-aunt), and Princess Mary (his cousin).

Earl of Macduff

Alastair was born shortly after the outbreak of the First World War, during which George V restructured the royal family by restricting the titles of prince and princess to the children of the sovereign, the children of the sovereign's sons, and the eldest living son of the eldest son of the Prince of Wales. This excluded Alastair from a princely title, but as the heir apparent to his mother's suo jure dukedom of Fife, he was entitled to use her secondary peerage Earl of Macduff as a courtesy title.

Later life

Lord Macduff was educated at Bryanston and the Royal Military College, Sandhurst, and was commissioned on 31 January 1935 as a second lieutenant into the Royal Scots Greys (2nd Dragoons), his father's regiment, then based in Egypt. On 14 July 1939, Lord Macduff was promoted to lieutenant and was later assigned to Ottawa as aide-de-camp to his kinsman the Earl of Athlone, then Governor General of Canada; his own grandfather had held the same post during the First World War.

His father having died in 1938, Alastair succeeded, on his grandfather's death in 1942, to the titles Duke of Connaught and Strathearn and Earl of Sussex. However, he died in 1943 at the age of 28 "on active service" in Ottawa, Ontario, Canada, in unusual circumstances. Newspapers at the time reported that he died of "natural causes."

Theo Aronson, in his 1981 biography of Princess Alice, Countess of Athlone, simply stated that the Duke "was found dead on the floor of his room at Rideau Hall on the morning of 26 April 1943. He had died, apparently, from hypothermia."  The diaries of Sir Alan Lascelles, King George VI's private secretary, published in 2006, recorded that both the regiment and Athlone had rejected him as incompetent, and he fell out of a window when drunk and perished of hypothermia overnight.

His ashes were interred at St Ninian's Chapel, Braemar, Scotland.

Titles, styles, honours and arms

Titles and styles
1914–1917: His Highness Prince Alastair of Connaught
1917–1942: Earl of Macduff
1942–1943: His Grace The Duke of Connaught and Strathearn

Arms
In 1942, on the inheritance of his paternal grandfather's dukedom, he was granted arms, being, quarterly, first and fourth his paternal grandfather's arms (being the royal arms, differenced with a three-point label argent, the first and third points bearing fleurs-de-lys azure, the second a cross gules), second and third his maternal grandfather's arms (quartering Fife and Duff).

Upon his death, the Dukedom of Connaught and Strathearn and the Earldom of Sussex became extinct. His first cousin, James Carnegie (23 September 1929 – 22 June 2015), succeeded as 3rd Duke of Fife and Earl of Macduff upon Princess Alexandra's death on 26 February 1959.

Ancestry

References

1914 births
1943 deaths
20th-century British people
Deaths from hypothermia
Accidental deaths in Ontario
British Army personnel killed in World War II
Dukes of Connaught and Strathearn
Graduates of the Royal Military College, Sandhurst
Heirs apparent who never acceded
Alastair, 2nd Duke of Connaught and Strathearn and Earl of Sussex
Alastair, 2nd Duke of Connaught and Strathearn and Earl of Sussex
Military personnel from London
People educated at Bryanston School
People from Mayfair
Alastair of Connaught
Royal Scots Greys officers